Hercule was a Scipion class 74-gun French ship of the line built at Rochefort.

In 1781, under Captain Turpin du Breuil, Hercule was in the Blue squadron of the fleet under De Grasse.  She took part in the Battle of the Chesapeake on 5 September 1781, and in the subsequent Siege of Yorktown.

Under Captain Jean Isaac Chadeau de la Clocheterie in the Battle of the Saintes.

Hercule was razéed in 1794. In May 1795, she was renamed to Hydre.

She was eventually broken up in 1799.

Sources and references 
 Notes

Citations

References
 

  (1671-1870)

Ships of the line of the French Navy
Scipion-class ships of the line